Sean Ryan (born 27 March 1948) is a former Irish judge who served as President of the Court of Appeal until March 2018. He previously served as a Judge of the High Court from 2003 to 2014.

As a barrister, he was Senior Counsel to the inquiry into abuse in the Catholic diocese of Ferns (the Ferns Report), and was Chairman of the Compensation Advisory Committee that prepared guidelines on compensation to be paid to abuse survivors at the Residential Institutions Redress Board.

In September 2003 Ryan was selected to head the Commission to Inquire into Child Abuse following the controversial resignation of the previous chair, Justice  Mary Laffoy, who claimed her work had been systematically obstructed by the Department of Education. The government appointed him a High Court judge, without seeking a recommendation from the Judicial Appointments Advisory Board, "to guarantee that the integrity and independence of the chairperson will be maintained."

Ryan published the Commission's public report on 20 May 2009 and it was immediately hailed as "a work of incalculable value to this country" and praised for its "meticulous gathering of evidence", though "Justice has not been done as many of the abusers will never face the rigours of the law."

In 2014 he was named by the Government as the President designate of the new Court of Appeal. He was nominated as President of the court by the Government on 29 October 2014  and appointed by the President of Ireland on the same day.

References

External links
CNN story on the Commission's report

Living people
1948 births
Presidents of the Court of Appeal (Ireland)
Irish barristers
High Court judges (Ireland)
21st-century Irish judges
Alumni of King's Inns